The Fairfax Christian School is a Christian school covering Pre-Kindergarten through 12th grade in Dulles, Virginia.

History
Founded in 1961 in Fairfax City, on the ground floor of a large Victorian home by Presbyterian clergyman Robert L. Thoburn. The Fairfax Christian School started as a Kindergarten through 8th grade institution before adding the 9th grade in 1964, 10th grade in 1965, 11th grade in 1966, and 12th grade in 1967. The first class of high school students graduated in the spring of 1968, the same year the school's total student population peaked at more than 650.

In 1981, the Fairfax Christian School was featured in an article in People Magazine that discussed how its teaching was based on, "...standards that come out of a biblical world." This commitment to an education rooted in biblical standards made the school extremely attractive to families in Washington, D.C.'s conservative community, including the families of former South Carolina Senator Strom Thurmond, former Illinois Representative Phil Crane, and Howard Phillips, founder of the Conservative Caucus.

In 1992 the Fairfax Christian School moved to Hunter Mill Road in Fairfax, Virginia. The 28-acre site included five academic buildings, soccer fields, basketball courts, volleyball courts and a playground.

In 2016, the Fairfax Christian School was the first K-12 school to receive the Presidential "E" Award from the Department of Commerce.  Secretary of Commerce Penny Pritzker noted, "The 'E' Awards Committee was very impressed with The Fairfax Christian School's dedication to providing quality education to students from around the world.  The school's adaptation of its curriculum to accommodate non-English speakers was also particularly notable."

In 2018 the Fairfax Christian School moved to its current location on Pacific Boulevard in Dulles, Virginia. The Dulles campus was purpose-built for Fairfax Christian School to new heights, featuring a 50,000 square-foot facility located on fifteen acres near Washington-Dulles International Airport. The site includes science labs, computer labs, an art studio, library, performance hall, five acres of natural parkland, a gymnasium, soccer field, playground, and other outdoor play areas.

Head of School
Jo A. S. Thoburn (2001–Present)

Location

Dulles Campus

The Fairfax Christian School is located on Pacific Boulevard in Dulles, Virginia. The 15-acre site includes a 50,000 square-foot state-of-the-art facility near Washington-Dulles International Airport.

Education
The Fairfax Christian School has students enrolled from Kindergarten through grade 12.

Though the school is Christian in name and practice, its website describes it as an "independent non-denominational school". It does not require students, nor their families, to be members of any Christian religion.

All academic instruction is conducted by a professional staff of 44.

Lower School

The Lower School includes Kindergarten through the 4th grade, where education focuses on introductory mathematics, phonics-based reading, history, science, physical education, art, music, French, Latin, and Bible study.

Middle School

The Middle School ranges from 5th through 8th grades, where education focuses on English, mathematics, science, history, foreign language (French, Spanish and Latin), physical education, music, and Bible study. Students in the Middle School also have the option to enroll in electives.

High School

High school level students study English and English literature, the sciences, mathematics (linear algebra through Calculus BC), foreign language (French, Spanish, Latin and Chinese), history, business, Bible study, art, music, and physical education. Students also have the opportunity to enroll in Advanced Placement courses and general electives like computer science and economics if they choose.

All high school students receive academic advising for college beginning in the 9th grade. Advising is provided by school administrators and teachers.

Enrollment
Fairfax Christian School features an approximate annual enrollment of 250, with an average class size of 15 students.

International

The Fairfax Christian School accepts international students. Many of these international students come to the school for an immersion in American culture, economic principles, and the English Language.

Student life
Arts

The Fairfax Christian School offers several options for students interested in the fine arts, including a fife & drum corps, music ensemble, A cappella choir, photography, and graphic design.

Athletics

As a member of the Northern Virginia Independent Athletic Conference, students in middle and high school are eligible to play sports including, boys’ and girls’ soccer, boys’ and girls’ basketball, boys’ and girls’ cross country, boys’ flag football, and girls’ volleyball.

The school mascot is the Cardinals.

Community service

All high school students at The Fairfax Christian School are required to complete an unspecified quantity of community service, and students are “free to serve where their interests lie.”

Notable alumni
Noteworthy Fairfax Christian School alumni include:
 Evan Bayh - United States Senator
 Bob Latta - United States Congressman 
 David Buckley - Former Inspector General of the Central Intelligence Agency
 Lee Cantelon – Composer and musician
 Paul Cantelon – Composer and musician

External links

References

Christian schools in Virginia
Private K-12 schools in Virginia
Educational institutions established in 1961
Schools in Loudoun County, Virginia
Fairfax, Virginia
Schools in Fairfax County, Virginia